Refuge de la Traye or Traie is a refuge in the Alps.

Created in 1982, it closes to the autumn of 2017; it is completely renovated and extended in 2019 to accommodate the first high-end refuge in the French Alps.

Website

Mountain huts in the Alps
Mountain huts in France